Helos was a town of ancient Ionia, near Erythrae.

Its site is tentatively located near the modern Denizgiren.

References

Populated places in ancient Ionia
Former populated places in Turkey